Charlemagne was an indie rock band from Madison, Wisconsin, led by former NoahJohn singer/songwriter, Carl Johns. Originally a Johns solo project, Charlemagne developed into a group, which toured Europe in 2004 and released three albums between 2004 and 2007, including two on SideCho Records.

Band members
 Carl Johns (a.k.a. Charlemagne), plays a little bit of everything, songwriter and producer
 William Borowski (a.k.a. The Equalizer, BB, Billions), bass guitar, claps
 Tenaya Darlington (a.k.a. Ladybird), backing vocals, triangle, claps
 Kaleen Enke (a.k.a. Katydid), backing vocals, guitar, Tambourine, claps
 Alex Fulton (a.k.a. A-12), drums, claps
 Dietrich Gosser (a.k.a. D, Titrich), acoustic guitar, bass guitar, backing vocals
 Ivan Klipstein, guitar, bass guitar, keyboards, backing vocals
 Brandon Schreiner (a.k.a. Kid B), guitar, Keyboards, Drums, Beats, backing vocals
 Curtis Whaley (a.k.a. The Arty Bastard, RTB), keyboards, claps, co-producer and graphic designer for Detour Allure

Discography
 Charlemagne (2004) Loose
 Detour Allure (2005 · SideCho Records)
 We Can Build An Island (2007 · SideCho Records)

External links
Charlemagne on MySpace
SideCho Records on MySpace

Footnote
The group has no relation to late 80s/early 90s Hollywood glam metal band Charlemagne, whose eponymous 1994 album was rereleased in 2009.

References

Musical groups from Wisconsin